David Franklin (born 7 May 1962) is an Australian actor best known to audiences for his roles as Meeklo Braca in the science fiction TV series Farscape and as Brutus in Xena: Warrior Princess.

Along with Farscape and Xena, his film appearances also include Crocodile Dundee in Los Angeles and The Matrix Reloaded.

Filmography

Film

Television

Video games

External links

1962 births
People from Fremantle
Australian male film actors
Australian male television actors
Australian male video game actors
Australian male voice actors
Living people